Daphnis layardii is a moth of the family Sphingidae. It was described by Frederic Moore in 1882 and is known from Sri Lanka.

It is similar to Daphnis moorei but smaller. The forewing upperside is similar to Daphnis moorei, but the white highlighting of many of the pattern elements reduced or absent, giving a much flatter and less contrasted pattern. The antemedian line is distinct only anteriorly.

References

Daphnis (moth)
Moths described in 1882